Sara or Sarah Nelson may refer to:

Sara Nelson (editor) (fl. 2000s–2010s), American publishing industry figure
Sara Nelson (union leader) (born 1973), International President of the Association of Flight Attendants-CWA, AFL-CIO
Sara Nelson (politician), member-elect of the Seattle City Council
Sarah Milledge Nelson (born 1931), American archaeologist and professor
Sarah Jane Nelson, American actress, singer and songwriter